Mussolini and I (alternately titled Mussolini: The Decline and Fall of Il Duce) is a 1985 made-for-television docudrama film directed by Alberto Negrin. It chronicles the strained relationship between Italy's fascist dictator Benito Mussolini and his son-in-law and foreign minister, Count Galeazzo Ciano, based on Ciano's diaries. Made in English as an Italian-French-German-Swiss-Spanish-US co-production, with Bob Hoskins, Anthony Hopkins and Susan Sarandon in the leading roles, it first aired on Rai Uno on 15 April 1985 in a 130-minute version. On 8 September 1985, it premiered in the USA on HBO in an extended four-hour version.

All filming was done in Italy; including northern Italy's Gargnano, Merano, Bolzano, Verona, and in central Italy, Rome and L'Aquila. Filming was also done at the well known Villa Torlonia and Palazzo Venezia. It was released on a 2 disc DVD in August 2003. It is divided into four segments for a total of 240 minutes and was released by Koch Entertainment.

Plot
The film starts just before World War II and shows the political and personal side of Benito Mussolini's fall from power and his death and the end of the war. It delves into his relationship with his son in-law, daughter, wife, mistress, and Hitler.

Cast
 Bob Hoskins as Benito Mussolini, dictator of Fascist Italy
 Susan Sarandon as Edda Ciano, Mussolini's daughter
 Anthony Hopkins as Count Galeazzo Ciano, Mussolini's son-in-law
 Annie Girardot as Rachele Mussolini, Mussolini's wife
 Barbara De Rossi as Claretta Petacci, Mussolini's mistress
 Massimo Dapporto as Vittorio Mussolini, Mussolini's son
 Vittorio Mezzogiorno as Alessandro Pavolini, friend of Galeazzo's and leader of the Republican Fascist Party
 Kurt Raab as Adolf Hitler, dictator of Nazi Germany
 Marne Maitland as King Victor Emmanuel III
 Hans-Dieter Asner as Joachim von Ribbentrop, Foreign Minister of the Third Reich
 Carlheinz Heitmann as Karl Wolff, Military Governor and Supreme SS and Police Leader of Northern Italy
 Harald Dietl as Otto Skorzeny, led Operation Oak to rescue Mussolini from Campo Imperatore
 Dietlinde Turban as Frau Beetz, born as Hildegard Burkhardt: she was a German intelligence agent who visited Galeazzo in prison and tried to help him
 Ted Rusoff as Francesco Saverio Nitti
 David-George Brown as Giuseppe Castellano
 Gianni Pulone as Enzo Galbiati
 Stefano De Sando as Dino Grandi
 Luciano Baglioni as Carlo Scorza
 Franco Meroni as Giuseppe Bottai
 Leslie Thomas as Emilio De Bono
 Piero Palermini as Roberto Farinacci
 Robert Sommer as Giacomo Suardo
 Franco Mazzieri as Giovanni Marinelli
 Ulrich Engst as Major Otto-Harald Mors
 Franco Fabrizi as Quinto Navarra

External links
 

1985 films
1985 television films
1980s biographical films
1980s historical films
Italian biographical films
Italian historical films
Italian television films
English-language Italian films
English-language television shows
Films directed by Alberto Negrin
Films about Benito Mussolini
Biographical television films
World War II television drama series
World War II films based on actual events
1980s Italian films